Fessonia is a genus of mites belonging to the family Smaridiidae. These mites can be distinguished from other related genera by having 2 pairs of eyes and always lacking sclerotized plates on the body.

References
Nine new species of the superfamily Erythraeoidea (Acarina: Trombidiformes) associated with plants in South Africa, Magdalena K.P. Meyer & P.A.J. Ryke, Acarologia I

Trombidiformes genera
Arachnids of Africa
Taxa named by Carl von Heyden